Fred Worthington (6 January 1924 – December 1995) was an English footballer who played as an inside forward in the Football League.

References

External links

1924 births
1995 deaths
English footballers
Sportspeople from Prestwich
Bury F.C. players
Leicester City F.C. players
Exeter City F.C. players
Oldham Athletic A.F.C. players
Chorley F.C. players
English Football League players
Association football forwards